Sekhmakh was the wife of the Nubian king Nastasen, who ruled in the Fourth century BC.

Sekhmakh is known from the great stela of the king, where she is depicted in the roundle. There is also her funerary stela, found in a temple at Jebel Barkal and obviously reused. The burial, where the stela was once placed is unknown. Sekhmakh bears the titles king's daughter, king's wife and mistress of Egypt. Her royal parents are unknown.

References

Literature 
 Laszlo Török, in: Fontes Historiae Nubiorum, Vol. II, Bergen 1996, 468,

External links 
 Stela of Nastasen, mentioning the queen

Queens of Kush